Saiva Bhanu Kshatriya College, is a general degree college located in Aruppukottai, Virudhunagar district, Tamil Nadu. The college is affiliated with Madurai Kamaraj University. This college offers different courses in arts, commerce and science.

Accreditation
The college is  recognized by the University Grants Commission (UGC).

References

External links
http://www.sbkcollegeapk.in/

Colleges affiliated to Madurai Kamaraj University
Universities and colleges in Madurai district